Karyne is a feminine given name of English and French origin, derived from the given name Karen. It used in England, Australia, United States, Canada and other English-speaking countries.

Notable people 
Notable people with this given name include:

 Karyne Di Marco (born 1978), Australian female hammer thrower
 Karyne Steben (born 1974), trapeze artist

See also 

 Karyn
 Karen
 Karine
 

English-language feminine given names
English feminine given names
French feminine given names
Given names
Feminine given names